Scientology has been established in New Zealand since 1955 and the Auckland organisation was the second Church of Scientology established in the world.

The 2006 census recorded 357 people affiliated to the Church of Scientology. The 2013 census showed 315 people identified with Scientology, and 321 in the 2018 census. The Church claims that it has 3500-5000 followers, with 30,000 being involved with the Church of Scientology since it was established in 1955.

The church is registered as a charity and Inland Revenue Department has granted charitable status to the church for tax purposes.

History 
Scientology was introduced to New Zealand by Frank Turnbull, who in 1953 flew from Christchurch to Philadelphia to study as a Scientologist. Whilst there, he met L. Ron Hubbard and was ordained the "Scientology Bishop of Oceania."

Dumbleton–Powles Report 
In 1968 a petition with 716 signatures called upon the Parliament of New Zealand to set up a board of inquiry into Scientology. The Commission of Inquiry into the Hubbard Scientology organisation in New Zealand issued public notice that it would hear evidence in Auckland and Wellington in March and April 1969. The commission aimed to "hear about and examine cases where it is said that Scientology has in New Zealand led to the estrangement of families, affected the control of persons under 21, or put unreasonable pressure upon former Scientologists who have left it, or other persons".

After hearing evidence, the Commission found against Scientology, concluding that "the activities, methods, and practices of Scientology did result in persons being subjected to improper or unreasonable pressures". However, on receiving assurances that Scientology would change its practices, the Commission recommended that - subject to those assurances - no immediate action be taken against Scientology.

The findings were published as the Dumbleton–Powles Report, authored by E.V. Dumbleton and Sir Guy Richardson Powles, and published on 30 June 1969.

Whitecliffe Campus 
In 2007, the Church of Scientology bought the heritage-listed Grafton building, formerly Whitecliffe College of Arts and Design for ten million dollars. It has been reported that the Church spent a further six million dollars on renovations. The building was opened on 21 January 2017 by David Miscavige.

Controversies 
In 2008 a protest against the church as part of Project Chanology was held in some parts of New Zealand by "Anonymous", a world-wide group that has concerns about internet censorship by Scientologists.

In 2012, it was reported that the Church of Scientology was receiving government grants to publish and distribute anti-drug pamphlets, and run rehabilitative services. The head of the New Zealand Drug Foundation called their practices "quackery" and disapproved of the Church getting this funding.

During the COVID-19 pandemic in New Zealand the Church of Scientology distributed 50,000 pamphlets in Auckland called Stay Well which were branded in similar colours to the New Zealand Government's COVID-19 branding. This led to some criticism, with some accusing the Church of capitalising on the pandemic to distribute religious material for their organisation in a deceptive manner. However, the Church of Scientology defended their pamphlet and distribution, saying that they had used this branding before the pandemic had started and that the pamphlet was clearly labelled as a Scientology publication

See also
Religion in New Zealand

References

External links
Church of Scientology of New Zealand
Church of Scientology of New Zealand (Auckland)
RehabilitateNZ - a promotional site for the Church of Scientology of New Zealand
The Dumbleton-Powles Report

New Zealand
Religion in New Zealand